Pavao Pintarić (4 April 1913 – 21 April 1990) was a Yugoslav fencer. He competed in the individual and team sabre events at the 1936 Summer Olympics.

References

External links
 

1913 births
1990 deaths
Yugoslav male sabre fencers
Olympic fencers of Yugoslavia
Fencers at the 1936 Summer Olympics